The 2018 FIL European Luge Championships took place under the auspices of the International Luge Federation at Sigulda, Latvia from 27 to 28 January 2018. This was the fourth time Sigulda hosted the event.

Schedule
Four events were held.

Medalists

Medal table

References

FIL European Luge Championships
FIL European Luge Championships
FIL European Luge Championships
Luge in Latvia
International luge competitions hosted by Latvia
Sport in Sigulda
January 2018 sports events in Europe